Goodrich is a village in Genesee County in the U.S. state of Michigan.  The population was 1,860 at the 2010 census. The village is a suburb of Flint located within Atlas Township.

Geography

Demographics

2010 census
As of the census of 2010, there were 1,860 people, 648 households, and 484 families living in the village. The racial makeup of the village was 98.1% White, 0.9% African American, 0.2% Native American, 0.2% Asian, 0.2% from other races, and 0.5% from two or more races. Hispanic or Latino of any race were 2.2% of the population.

There were 648 households, of which 45.1% had children under the age of 18 living with them, 59.9% were married couples living together, 9.7% had a female householder with no husband present, 5.1% had a male householder with no wife present, and 25.3% were non-families. 21.0% of all households were made up of individuals, and 8.8% had someone living alone who was 65 years of age or older. The average household size was 2.83 and the average family size was 3.33.

The median age in the village was 36.9 years. 32.6% of residents were under the age of 18; 5.6% were between the ages of 18 and 24; 27% were from 25 to 44; 24.5% were from 45 to 64; and 10.3% were 65 years of age or older. The gender makeup of the village was 49.7% male and 50.3% female.

2000 census
As of the census of 2000, there were 1,353 people, 494 households, and 385 families living in the village. The racial makeup of the village was 98.52% White, 0.22% African American, 0.15% Native American, 0.59% Asian, 0.07% from other races, and 0.44% from two or more races. Hispanic or Latino of any race were 1.03% of the population.

There were 494 households, out of which 44.3% had children under the age of 18 living with them, 66.6% were married couples living together, 8.7% had a female householder with no husband present, and 21.9% were non-families. 20.6% of all households were made up of individuals, and 5.7% had someone living alone who was 65 years of age or older.  The average household size was 2.70 and the average family size was 3.12.

In the village, the population was spread out, with 29.6% under the age of 18, 5.5% from 18 to 24, 35.0% from 25 to 44, 21.5% from 45 to 64, and 8.5% who were 65 years of age or older.  The median age was 35 years. For every 100 females, there were 101.6 males.  For every 100 females age 18 and over, there were 99.4 males.

The median income for a household in the village was $65,089, and the median income for a family was $74,063. Males had a median income of $55,000 versus $31,641 for females. The per capita income for the village was $26,089.  About 1.6% of families and 2.7% of the population were below the poverty line, including 1.0% of those under age 18 and 6.3% of those age 65 or over.

History

Mr. and Mrs. Levi H. Goodrich traveled via steam ship from Buffalo to Detroit to settle after they had sold their home in the summer of 1835.  They journeyed from Detroit towards modern-day Pontiac, where they met land explorers who told them of the land's beauty. When they reached the vicinity of Davison's Mill (now Atlas), they found rich, fertile soil, an excess of timber, and readily available water. They returned to Detroit and purchased one thousand acres (4 km) at $1.25 per acre. They returned to their old home in Clarence, New York and prepared to return to their purchased property. It was decided that Moses and Levi, the eldest and third of the six brothers, would travel back via Canada. They completed their journey in 16 days, and built a cabin before the family arrived on May 20, 1836. The first wood-frame house was built for Enos Goodrich in 1838.

The first tavern, The Goodrich House, was built in 1866 by a Mr. Matthew Davidson.  This was a popular spot for trading and salesman.  In over one hundred years, there were several owners, the most notable being Ben Yerkey, The Cicote Brothers (famous for their baseball career) and Emery Rockafellow.  After the Death of Rockefellow, the tavern was bought by S. M. Hegel. The house fell victim to a fire in 2009 and was subsequently torn down.

See also
 Goodrich Area Schools

References

Villages in Genesee County, Michigan
Villages in Michigan
Populated places established in 1836
1957 establishments in Michigan